WWE Vengeance, known as NXT Vengeance Day since 2021, is an American professional wrestling event produced by WWE, a professional wrestling promotion based in Connecticut. The event was originally created in 2001 as a pay-per-view (PPV), when the promotion was still called the World Wrestling Federation (WWF). Since 2021, the event has been held annually in February for WWE's developmental territory, NXT, under the title NXT Vengeance Day which is a reference to the event taking place on or around Valentine's Day.

The event initially replaced Armageddon for the promotion's December 2001 PPV due to sensitivity issues following the September 11 attacks. However, Armageddon would return the following year, with Vengeance moving up to July as a replacement for Fully Loaded. Following the promotion being renamed to WWE and the implementation of the brand extension in early 2002, the event was made exclusive to the SmackDown brand in 2003, and then Raw from 2004 to 2006 before WWE discontinued brand-exclusive pay-per-views.

In 2007, Vengeance was held as Vengeance: Night of Champions, with all of WWE's championships at the time being contested. Night of Champions would replace Vengeance as a standalone chronology the following year, but Vengeance made a one-off return in October 2011. In February 2021, WWE revived Vengeance for the NXT brand as a TakeOver event called Vengeance Day, which was the first Vengeance to air via livestreaming in addition to traditional PPV. The TakeOver series was discontinued that September, however, Vengeance continued on under the Vengeance Day name with the 2022 event being held as a television special of the NXT program, thus establishing Vengeance Day as NXT's annual Valentine's event. The 2023 event will return Vengeance to being a livestreaming event, but not PPV, as beginning with the 2022 calendar year, NXT's major events only air on WWE's livestreaming platforms.

History
The inaugural Vengeance was held on December 9, 2001, replacing Armageddon as the then-World Wrestling Federation's (WWF) December pay-per-view (PPV); WWF staff felt that the "Armageddon" title was too sensitive following the September 11 attacks. However, Armageddon would return the following year, with Vengeance moving up to July as a replacement for Fully Loaded (which had been replaced in 2001 by Invasion, the first PPV to incorporate the Invasion angle). The 2002 event was also the first Vengeance to be promoted under the World Wrestling Entertainment (WWE) name, after the WWF was renamed to WWE earlier that same year.

Following the brand extension in early 2002, where the promotion divided its roster into two separate brands where wrestlers exclusively performed on their respective weekly television programs, Vengeance became exclusive to SmackDown! in 2003, and then Raw from 2004 through 2006. WWE then discontinued brand-exclusive pay-per-views following WrestleMania 23 in April 2007; the 2007 edition was branded as Vengeance: Night of Champions, with all nine of WWE's championships at the time being contested, which included the ECW brand, which had been established the previous year. Night of Champions would become its own chronology in 2008, replacing Vengeance in its July slot on WWE's PPV lineup.

In April 2011, WWE ceased using its full name with the "WWE" abbreviation becoming an orphaned initialism, while that August, the brand extension ended. That October, Vengeance made a one-off return, replacing Bragging Rights. Vengeance was again discontinued after 2011. In January 2021, over four years after the brand split was reinstated, WWE's NXT brand announced that it would revive Vengeance as an NXT TakeOver show on February 14 titled NXT TakeOver: Vengeance Day; its title also alluded to the event's Valentine's Day scheduling. This would also be the first Vengeance to air on WWE's online streaming service, the WWE Network (which launched in February 2014), in addition to traditional PPV. Due to the COVID-19 pandemic, the event was held in a bio-secure bubble called the Capitol Wrestling Center, hosted at the WWE Performance Center in Orlando, Florida.

In September 2021, NXT was rebranded and reverted the brand to its original function as WWE's developmental territory. The TakeOver series was also discontinued, but Vengeance Day continued on as its own event, with the 2022 event scheduled for February 15, 2022. Unlike all previous Vengeance events, however, the 2022 event was held as a television special, airing as a special episode of NXT. This in turn established Vengeance Day as NXT's annual Valentine's event. 

On December 8, 2022, WWE announced that the 2023 Vengeance Day would be held on Saturday, February 4, 2023, at the Spectrum Center in Charlotte, North Carolina, marking the first major NXT event to be held in North Carolina and the second Vengeance event held at this venue after the 2006 event (when the venue was still called the Charlotte Bobcats Arena). It was also announced that it would return to being a livestreaming event (but not PPV), airing on Peacock in the United States and the WWE Network in international markets, in turn marking the first Vengeance to air on Peacock due to the American WWE Network merging under Peacock in March 2021 (beginning with the 2022 calendar year, NXT's major events no longer air on PPV, just livestreaming). This also marks the first standalone NXT livestreaming event to be held outside of Florida since NXT TakeOver: Portland in February 2020, just before the onset of the COVID-19 pandemic.

Events

See also
 List of WWE pay-per-view and WWE Network events
 List of WWE NXT special episodes

References

External links

 
Recurring events established in 2001
Recurring events disestablished in 2011